
Gmina Osiek Mały is a rural gmina (administrative district) in Koło County, Greater Poland Voivodeship, in west-central Poland.

Villages
Gmina Osiek Mały contains the villages and settlements of Borecznia Wielka, Dęby Szlacheckie, Drzewce, Felicjanów, Grądy, Lipiny, Łuczywno, Maciejewo, Młynek, Moczydła, Nowa Wieś, Nowe Budki, Nowy Budzisław, Osiek Mały, Osiek Mały-Kolonia, Osiek Wielki, Rosocha, Smólniki Osieckie, Smólniki Racięckie, Stare Budki, Stary Budzisław, Szarłatów, Trzebuchów, Witowo and Zielenie.

Neighbouring gminas
Gmina Osiek Mały is bordered by the town of Koło and by the gminas of Babiak, Koło, Kramsk and Sompolno.

References
Polish official population figures 2006

Osiek Maly
Koło County